Raphaël Toussaint (pseudonym of Jacques de la Croix; born 25 April 1937, in La Roche-sur-Yon), is a French painter residing in the Vendée department. Landscape designer, he practices “poetic reality”.
His motto as a painter is:

Biography
In 1956, while studying classical singing, Jacques de la Croix, the future Raphaël Toussaint, met the one who became his wife in 1959. As a result, he met René Robin: the father of his future wife who ran a store in La Roche-sur-Yon which later became the Robin gallery. For Raphaël Toussaint, this meeting was a determining element that influenced the course of his life.  

Called to do his military service, it was in 1957 that he embarked in civilian clothes on the Sidi Bel Abbès II bound for Oran (Algeria) where he disembarked on 13 July. He studied at the Nouvion military camp near Oran at the 21st RTA. On 16 November, he was assigned to the 2nd RI 3rd company, at "ferme 35" in the Aumale region south of Algiers. Seriously wounded during the night of 8–9 April, he was repatriated to France in May and permanently retired as a major war invalid.

After this injury, Jacques de la Croix could no longer continue studying the classical singing he had practised since his adolescence. His career as a singer halted, he decided to devote himself entirely to painting, helped by his father-in-law, René Robin, and he changed his name to become Raphaël Toussaint. With René Robin, he came into direct contact with the landscape and began his first period. His painting Holidays in Saint Raphaël would determine the profile of what became the definitive expression of his art. René Robin directed him towards naive art, because he felt that his vocation is there thanks to his patience and meticulousness. Until 1970, he worked under the secrecy of anonymity in order to make sure that his choice to devote himself entirely to painting was not an adventure without a future.
It was in 1965 that he began his first exhibitions in different galleries and that he was selected the following year to participate in the Salon “Comparaisons” at the Grand Palais (Paris). A few years passed where he affirmed his talent and in 1971 he was appointed Member of the Salon d'Automne. “Be congratulated and thanked, your work is beneficial, it carries within it the true values of life, the quiet and firm certainty that happiness is in simplicity, and not in money which is a lure. To build a work such as yours, in our times of anguish and iron, dear Raphaël Toussaint, is to bring us closer to the angels ... ” declares Édouard Georges Mac-Avoy, the president of Salon d'Automne, in 1990.

His life as a professional and official painter then came to light. It was in 1973 that he formalized his pseudonym Raphaël Toussaint by means of a notarial deed. In a publication in 2004, the art collector and critic Henri Griffon considers him a symbol of this movement of expression of modern primitive. “He is not an imitator, nor a follower, he is Toussaint. On the walls of a gallery, the informed eye will recognize the invoice of a great master ” , thus estimates Henri Griffon.

Paris-Grand Palais-Exposition 1982 “The Genius of the Naive”

The following year, at the Salon de la Nationale des Beaux Arts, he was appointed Associate by President François Baboulet.

He exhibited his painting, On a beautiful winter morning. This painting was stolen from the Grand Palais in Paris during the Salon de la Nationale des Beaux Arts and never found.

To pay tribute to his Mentor René Robin, whom he includes in all his paintings, Raphaël Toussaint publishes a wax seal which is affixed to the back of each of his works as a second signature.

Wanting to give a new dimension to his career, he wrote and implemented in 1990 a work of art The very rich hours of Raphaël Toussaint, prefaced by various personalities from the world of the arts including Paul Guth. The latter writes: "Raphaël Toussaint, a naive painter? ... A problem that bothers him. In France, country of labels, we stuck this one on the overcoat. And to me too. Him, in painting, me in literature for my romantic cycle of the Naive. Labels twins. Did this naive title bother you? he asks me. I answer for both of us: yes and no. Naive does not mean silly, beta, idiotic. Naive comes from the Latin word , as on the day of his birth. The naive is the one who is born every day, and the world with him. It has the spirit of childhood, one of the treasures of Saint Francis of Assisi".
He exhibited in numerous salons and galleries in France but also in particular in the United States (in Texas and Florida. In Paris, he exhibited at Galerie 93 du Faubourg Saint-Honoré for twenty-five years, between 1965 and 1991 (gallery closed). Locally, the Vendée department organized a major retrospective for his thirty years of painting (1964–1994). In 2001, the  museum, opens its doors to him for a major exhibition "Landscape or a certain regard". He regularly takes part in the Parisian Salons of which he is a member.,

Works

Awards
 2000 : Médaille de la ville de Paris
 2004 : Chevalier des Arts et Lettres
 2010 : Prix Francis Davis Millet

Exhibitions

Written works
  Hommage to the Salon Yonnais - Municipal museum of La Roche-sur-Yon}}
  Book of art.
  On the occasion of a retrospective exhibition at the Conseil général de la Vendée
 
 
  Illustrated agenda
 
  Poems

References

Bibliography
 
  Texte and photo of tableau Le Bouquet au chat by Raphaël Toussaint.
  The face of a landscaper from the Vendée through his works Les mariés, La route du bonheur and Virginie ou l'enfant à la marguerite by Raphaël Toussaint.
  From the art of the miniature painting to the art of the monumental  as seen through the works Les mariés du Poiré-sur-Vie, La peinture murale du Poiré-sur-Vie and L'église de Saint Etienne du Brioullet by Raphaël Toussaint.
  Texts and photos of the works Maison de Maître et le vieux Four à chaux and Le puy du Fou sous la neige by Raphaël Toussaint.
 Texts and photos of the works  Le Mont des alouettes au champ de blé de Raphaël Toussaint.}}
 Texts and photos of the work  La Tour d'Arundel – Les Sables d'Olonne by Raphaël Toussaint.}}
 Texts and photos of the work Saint-Mars-des-Près  sous la neige by Raphaël Toussaint.}}
 Texts and photos of the works Maison de Maître et le vieux Four à chaux and Le puy du Fou sous la neige by Raphaël Toussaint.
  Text and photo of the work La vieille église de Pouzauges en Vendée by Raphaël Toussaint.
  Texts and photos of the works Vendanges au Château de la Preuille and Le Château du Puy du Fou sous la neige by Raphaël Toussaint.

External links 

 
 Catalogue raisonné (Received catalogue)
 Exposition : Les voyages pittoresques de Raphaël Toussaint (Exhibition: The picturesque voyages of Raphaël Toussaint)

20th-century French painters
21st-century French painters
People from La Roche-sur-Yon
1937 births
Living people